Pastoralist may refer to:

 Pastoralism, raising livestock on natural pastures
 Pastoral farming, settled farmers who grow crops to feed their livestock
 People who keep or raise sheep, sheep farming